Thundridge is a village and civil parish in the East Hertfordshire district, in the county of Hertfordshire, England. 

It is about two miles away from the town of Ware and about seven miles away from the large town of Hertford, the county town of Hertfordshire.

Nearby settlements 
Nearby villages include Wadesmill and Tonwell, and the hamlets of Cold Christmas and High Cross.

Transport

Road 
Thundridge is on Ermine Street, which is a Roman road, and it was on the A10 road until it was by-passed in 2005, restoring it to a quiet village.

Rail 
Ware  is the nearest railway station.  There was formerly a line in the Rib valley, the Buntingford branch line

Amenities 
Thundridge has a primary school, along with three pubs in the shape of The Anchor, The Maltons (previously The Sow & Pigs), and The Feathers. The village also has a cricket team, along with Thundridge United Football Club, who play in the Hertford and District League 2.

History 
The village of Thundridge was originally located about half a mile to the east of the current Thundridge location, also adjacent to the River Rib. Thundridge derives from the Old English Þunres hrycg = "ridge belonging to the god Thunor or Thor". There are references to "Tonrich" in the Domesday Book with land being held by the Bishop of Bayeux and tenanted by Hugh de Grentmesnil, with the record indicating that there was a drop in the value of the land from 100 shillings to 40 shillings. There had however been civilised habitation in the area earlier than that, with both Roman and Saxon remains being found in the adjacent estate known as "Youngsbury" just a few hundred yards away from the old Thundridge location.

With the 1826 improvement of the London to Cambridge road that runs on the west side of the current Thundridge village location – formerly it had run a more crooked path through "Ermine" or "Back Street" in the village – there was an increased populous migration to the "new" location of Thundridge, adjacent to the main road. All that now remain of the old Thundridge location are the 15th-century church tower of the "Thundridge Old Church" of All Hallows and Little Saint Mary, and a few bricks from the chimney-stack of the Manorial home of Thundridgebury. In recent years, the Old Church has come under threat from vandalism, decay and an ecclesiastical desire to divest itself of the cost and liability of maintenance. The "Thundridge Old Church Action Group" (abbr. "TOCAG") is working to achieve some form of permanent protection.

Thundridgebury was built during the reign of Henry VIII, possibly by Henry Gardiner – the Gardiners being a family that became prominent in later years, and giving name to the nearby wood "Gardiner's Spring". The last inhabitants of Thundridgebury were the Hollingsworth family, they having rented it from Daniel Giles, who had in turn purchased it from the Gardiners. The house was dismantled in the early 19th century, as was subsequently the church in 1853, with only the chimney-stack and tower remaining respectively. According to local legend, the chimney stack was left standing in order to allow the owners to continue to collect rent, but a later local legend (which was correct) was that its presence allowed the owners to maintain a pew in the new Thundridge church – built in the "new" Thundridge location in 1851 and consecrated in 1853 – as technically the manorial land which had been absorbed into the Youngsbury estate when purchased by the Giles, now fell under the parish of Standon, the church for which was some 5 miles distant. So long as the chimney-stack remained however, the pew in the Thundridge church was kept available for the owners of the (now combined) property of Youngsbury.

See also
 The Hundred Parishes

References

External links
 Thundridge Village Hall website

 Thundridge Old Church website
 Thundridge Village School website
 Hertfordshire Genealogy website Thundridge Information
 Visitor UK website Thundridge Information
 Thundridge Old Church Historical Information

Villages in Hertfordshire
Civil parishes in Hertfordshire
East Hertfordshire District